"The Abandoned" is the 52nd episode of the syndicated American science fiction television series Star Trek: Deep Space Nine, the sixth episode of the third season. It is directed by cast member Avery Brooks, who portrays Commander Benjamin Sisko. Brooks directed nine television episodes in this series overall. It was written by D. Thomas Maio and Steve Warnek, and aired October 31, 1994 in syndication.

Set in the 24th century, the series follows the adventures on Deep Space Nine, a space station located near a stable wormhole between the Alpha and Gamma quadrants of the Milky Way Galaxy, near the planet Bajor. The Gamma Quadrant is home to the Dominion, a hostile empire ruled by the shape-shifting Changelings, which maintains control through its genetically-engineered soldiers, the Jem'Hadar. In this episode, an abandoned unknown alien infant found aboard the station grows into an adult Jem'Hadar (played by Bumper Robinson).

Plot
An infant is found in the wreckage of a ship that the bartender Quark (Armin Shimerman) buys as salvage. The boy grows at a phenomenal rate, developing in appearance to an eight-year-old in only a few hours. Dr. Bashir (Alexander Siddig) determines that the child is the result of genetic engineering. As the boy continues to develop, his aggression, evolving appearance, and reverence to security chief Odo (a rogue Changeling) reveal that he is Jem'Hadar.

Odo (René Auberjonois) convinces Commander Sisko (Avery Brooks) that the boy should not be sent to Starfleet Command as a specimen to be studied. He believes that he can control the boy because Jem'Hadar are bred to serve the Changelings. Odo tries to show the boy, physically now a teenager, options for his life besides violence, but the boy's only drive seems to be to fight. When it is discovered that Starfleet has sent a ship to pick up the boy, the boy pulls a phaser and refuses to go along. Odo insists on returning the boy to the Gamma Quadrant and Sisko reluctantly agrees.

In a side plot, Commander Sisko's son Jake (Cirroc Lofton) is dating an older woman named Mardah (Jill Sayre), who is a Dabo girl at Quark's bar. Commander Sisko is very concerned and invites Mardah to dinner. Though originally intending to intervene and end the relationship, the Commander discovers through Mardah a hidden side to his son he realizes must be allowed to flourish.

Reception 
Reviewing the episode for Tor.com in 2013, Keith R.A. DeCandido gave it a rating of 7 out of 10, saying Brooks "directed beautifully". He described the B-plot with Jake and Mardah as "compelling" and praised Cirroc Lofton and Jill Sayre's acting performances.

Release 
The episode was released on June 3, 2003 in North America as part of the season 3 DVD box set. This episode was released in 2017 on  DVD with the complete series 48 disc box set, which had 176 episodes and additional featurettes.

The episode was released on August 3, 1999 in the United States on LaserDisc, paired with "Second Skin". The double sided optical disc had a total runtime of 92 minutes of NTSC video.

"Second Skin" and "The Abandoned" were released on VHS in the United Kingdom on one cassette, Star Trek: Deep Space Nine 3.3 - Second Skin/The Abandoned.

See also

Star Trek episodes exploring the same theme of a lone young growing up amongst the crew:
 "The Child (Star Trek: The Next Generation)"
 "Drone (Star Trek: Voyager)"
 "I, Borg (Star Trek: The Next Generation)"

References

External links
 

Star Trek: Deep Space Nine (season 3) episodes
1994 American television episodes
Films scored by Jay Chattaway
Television episodes directed by Avery Brooks